Ventilago denticulata is a species of tree with a wide distribution in East, Southeast, and South Asia, and including in Indo-China, China (Guangxi, Guizhou, and Yunnan), and most of India.

References

Rhamnaceae
Flora of China
Flora of Indo-China
Flora of India (region)